The  was an armored personnel and ammunition carrier used by the Imperial Japanese Army in World War II.

History and development

Type 98 So-Da was designed in 1937, with a chassis based on the Type 97 Te-Ke tankette. However, its engine compartment was moved to the front of the chassis. The vehicle was first produced in 1941. The Type 98 So-Da was used as a personnel and ammunition carrier in forward-line areas. In addition, it was also used as an "artillery tractor", to tow a gun trailer.

Its hull had an open top and the "flatbed" in back had a double door at the rear. The flatbed could be covered with a tarp over the three rail supports. The towing coupling was secured to the frame of the hull on a "semi-elliptical spring". This protected the frame while hauling heavy equipment.

Notes

References

External links
Taki's Imperial Japanese Army Page - Akira Takizawa

Tracked armoured personnel carriers
Armoured personnel carriers of Japan
Artillery tractors
Mitsubishi
Military vehicles introduced from 1940 to 1944
Armoured personnel carriers of WWII